Ulmus × hollandica 'Alba' is one of a number of hybrids arising from the crossing of the Wych Elm U. glabra with a variety of Field Elm U. minor. First mentioned by Kirchner in 1864 as  U. fulva Hort. var. alba.

Description
A specimen in the Herb. Nicholson at Kew was identified by Melville  as a rather broad-leafed form of U. × hollandica var vegeta (sensu Rehder).

Cultivation 
No specimens are known to survive.

References

Dutch elm cultivar
Ulmus articles missing images
Ulmus
Missing elm cultivars